Bird collision may refer to:

 Bird–skyscraper collisions
 Towerkill: due to antenna towers and masts
 Bird strike with cars or planes